The Kadu languages, also known as Kadugli–Krongo or Tumtum, are a small language family of the Kordofanian geographic grouping, once included in Niger–Congo. However, since Thilo Schadeberg (1981), Kadu is widely seen as Nilo-Saharan. Evidence for a Niger-Congo affiliation is rejected, and a Nilo-Saharan relationship is controversial. A conservative classification would treat the Kadu languages as an independent family.

Classification
Blench (2006) notes that Kadu languages share similarities with multiple African language phyla, including Niger-Congo and Nilo-Saharan, suggesting a complex history of linguistic convergence and contact. However, more recently, Blench states that Kadu is almost certainly Nilo-Saharan, with its closest relationship being with Eastern Sudanic.

Like the Nilotic, Surmic, and Kuliak, Kadu languages have verb-initial word order. However, most other languages of the Nuba Mountains, Darfur, and the Sudan-Ethiopia border region have verb-final word order.

Branches
There are three branches:

Western: Tulishi, Keiga, Kanga
Central: Kadugli (incl. Miri, Katcha)
Eastern: Krongo, Tumtum

Classification
Hall & Hall (2004), based on Schadeberg (1987), classify the languages as follows.

Dafalla (2000) compares 179 cognates in Kadugli, Kamda, Kanga, Katcha, Keiga, Kufa, Miri, Shororo-Kursi, and Tulishi. Dafalla's (2000) results are similarly to those of Schadeberg (1989).

Reconstructions
Some Kadu quasi-reconstructions by Blench (2006):

Comparative vocabulary
Sample basic vocabulary for Kadu languages:

Numerals
Comparison of numerals in individual languages:

See also
Kadu word lists (Wiktionary)

Further reading
Blench, Roger. 2006. The Kadu Languages and Their Affiliation: between Nilo-Saharan, Niger-Congo and Afro-Asiatic. Insights into Nilo-Saharan Language, History, and Culture. Al-Amin Abu-Manga, L. Gilley & A. Storch eds. 101-127. Köln: Rüdiger Köppe.

Stevenson, Roland; Roger Blench (ed). Comparative Kadu Datasheets.
Reh, Mechthild. 1983. Die Krongo-Sprache (nììnò mó-dì): Beschreibung, Texte, Wörterverzeichnis. (Kölner Beiträge zur Afrikanistik, 12.) Berlin: Dietrich Reimer.
Schadeberg, Thilo. 1994. Comparative Kadu Wordlists. Afrikanistische Arbeitspapiere 40:11-48. University of Cologne.

Notes and references

Dafalla, Rihab Yahia. 2000. A Phonological Comparison of the Katcha Kadugli Language Groups in the Nuba Mountains. M.A. Dissertation, University of Khartoum.
Schadeberg, Thilo C. 1981. "The Classification of the Kadugli Language Group". Nilo-Saharan, ed. by T. C. Schadeberg and M. Lionel Bender, pp. 291–305.  Dordrecht: Foris Publications.

 

Language families